Michel Medinger (born 18 April 1941) is a Luxembourgian middle-distance runner. He competed in the men's 800 metres at the 1964 Summer Olympics. His father, Michel, competed at the 1936 Summer Olympics.

References

1941 births
Living people
Athletes (track and field) at the 1964 Summer Olympics
Luxembourgian male middle-distance runners
Olympic athletes of Luxembourg
Place of birth missing (living people)